The nimble ctenotus (Ctenotus hanloni)  is a species of skink found in the Northern Territory, South Australia, and Western Australia.

References

hanloni
Reptiles described in 1980
Taxa named by Glen Milton Storr